Patricia M. Shields (born 1951) is a Regents' Professor in the Political Science Department at Texas State University. Since 2001 she has been Editor-in-Chief of the international and interdisciplinary journal Armed Forces & Society. She is also a Contributing Editor to Parameters: The US Army War College Quarterly and the Section Editor of the Military and Society section to the Handbook of Military Sciences. Shields is notable for her publications focusing on research methods, civil military relations, gender issues, pragmatism in public administration, peace studies, and the contributions of Jane Addams to public administration and peace theory. She received a BA in Economics from the University of Maryland - College Park, an MA in Economics and a PhD in Public Administration from The Ohio State University.

Scholarship 
As a scholar, Shields promoted the classical pragmatism of C. S. Peirce, William James, and John Dewey as an "organizing principle" for the discipline of public administration. Her publication, "The Community of inquiry: Classical Pragmatism and Public Administration" (2003), began an ongoing, interdisciplinary, academic debate in the journal Administration & Society. She applies the feminist pragmatism of Jane Addams to Public Administration.

Shields is also notable in the public administration community for utilizing pragmatism to advance research methodology in the field. For example, Shields is responsible in part for popularizing Dewey's notion of the working hypothesis as a method of preliminary, qualitative, exploratory research, in addition to the concept of the practical ideal type for program evaluation.<ref>Shields, Patricia and Hassan Tajalli. 2006. "Intermediate Theory: The Missing Link in Successful Student Scholarship." Journal of Public Affairs Education Vol. 12. No. 3.</ref>http://newforums.com/title-list/featured-authors/pat-shields/ Website accessed July 12, 2014

 Recognition 
She received recognition by the American Society for Public Administration, the Section for Women in Public Administration with the Rita Mae Kelly Award for her contribution to gender studies in public administration, National Association of Schools of Public Affairs and Administration with the Leslie A. Whittington Award for excellence in teaching research methods, the Inter-University Seminar for Armed and Society with the Morris Janowitz Career Achievement Award and the journal Public Administration Review'' with the Laverne Burchfield Award. Texas State University has recognized her with the Presidential Seminar Award, The Presidential Award for Excellence in Teaching and the Everett Swinney Faculty Senate Excellence in Teaching Award. She is a fellow of the National Academy of Public Administration.

References

External links 

1951 births
Living people
Texas State University faculty
Public administration scholars
John Glenn College of Public Affairs alumni
University of Maryland, College Park alumni
American women political scientists
American political scientists
American women academics
21st-century American women